Dulwich was a borough constituency in the Dulwich area of South London, which returned one Member of Parliament (MP)  to the House of Commons of the Parliament of the United Kingdom.

The constituency was created by the Redistribution of Seats Act 1885 for the 1885 general election.  The constituency was abolished by the Boundary Commission in 1997, when most of its former territory became part of the Dulwich and West Norwood constituency.

History 
The constituency of Dulwich was created by the Redistribution of Seats Act 1885, as one of nine covering the enlarged parliamentary former borough of Lambeth. Lambeth councillors had been overwhelmingly progressive Liberals though this part of the seat did have Conservative parish/urban district councillors before 1885. Dulwich was one of three seats in the new parliamentary borough of Camberwell.

As a suburban London constituency, Dulwich tended to favour the Conservatives, and returned a Conservative member in each election between 1885 and 1945, when it fell to the Labour party. After that it became a marginal seat, with Labour winning slightly more times than the Conservatives. In 1892 the Liberal candidate estimated that it had around 4,000 working class voters out of around 10,500 and observed that although it had a reputation as a 'villa constituency' there were many voters in the many less impressive houses.

Boundaries 

1885–1918: The wards of Camberwell and Dulwich, and the hamlet of Penge.

1918–1950: The Metropolitan Borough of Camberwell wards of Alleyn, College, Hamlet, Ruskin, and St John's. Penge was transferred to the new Bromley constituency.

1950–1974: The Metropolitan Borough of Camberwell wards of Alleyn, College, Hamlet, Lyndhurst, Nunhead, Ruskin, Rye, Rye Lane, and St John's.

1974–1997: The London Borough of Southwark wards of Alleyn, Bellenden, College, Lyndhurst, Ruskin, Rye, The Lane, and Waverley.

Members of Parliament

Elections

Elections in the 1990s

Elections in the 1980s

Elections in the 1970s

Elections in the 1960s

Elections in the 1950s

Elections in the 1940s

Elections in the 1930s
The candidates selected for the aborted 1939–1940 general election were;
Conservative:  Bracewell Smith
Liberal: C. R. Cooke-Taylor
Labour: Wilfrid Vernon

Elections in the 1920s

Elections in the 1910s

Elections in the 1900s

Elections in the 1890s

Elections in the 1880s

See also 
 1887 Dulwich by-election
 1903 Dulwich by-election
 1906 Dulwich by-election
 1932 Dulwich by-election
 Southwark local elections

References

Sources

External links 
 Parliamentary contributions from Dulwich members, 1884–1974 (Hansard)

Parliamentary constituencies in London (historic)
Constituencies of the Parliament of the United Kingdom established in 1885
Constituencies of the Parliament of the United Kingdom disestablished in 1997
Politics of the London Borough of Southwark
Parliamentary constituency